Liu Shao ( 190s–240s), courtesy name Kongcai, was an official of the state of Cao Wei during the Three Kingdoms period of China. He often provided advice to the emperor Cao Rui, and was praised by Cao Rui for his good advice, even though Cao Rui did not frequently actually act on the advice. He also wrote poems to try to discourage Cao Rui from military and palace-building projects. When Sun Quan, the emperor of Wei's rival state Eastern Wu, led an army to attack the Wei stronghold at Hefei in 234, Liu Shao suggested to Cao Rui to send his forces to cut off Sun Quan's supply route rather than engage Sun Quan directly – a strategy that forced Sun Quan to withdraw. (However, according to Sima Guang's Zizhi Tongjian, it was Tian Yu who offered this advice, not Liu Shao.)

Liu Shao was also the author of the People Records, an early Chinese treatise on human character.

See also
 Lists of people of the Three Kingdoms

References

 Chen, Shou (3rd century). Records of the Three Kingdoms (Sanguozhi).
 Pei, Songzhi (5th century). Annotations to Records of the Three Kingdoms (Sanguozhi zhu).

External links
 

Year of birth unknown
Year of death unknown
Cao Wei politicians
Politicians from Handan
Cao Wei poets
Cao Wei musicians
Musicians from Hebei
Poets from Hebei
Cao Wei essayists